The C.C. Hampton Homestead near Harrisburg, Nebraska, dates from 1890 and is listed on the National Register of Historic Places as a  historic district.  Also known as Warner Ranch, the property included 10 contributing buildings and one other contributing structure.

It was the 1887–1902 homestead of a farmer who promoted water conservation and Aermotor windmills, helping region diversify from ranching into farming.

It was listed on the National Register of Historic Places in 1984.

References 

Farms on the National Register of Historic Places in Nebraska
Houses completed in 1890
Buildings and structures in Banner County, Nebraska
Ranches on the National Register of Historic Places
Historic districts on the National Register of Historic Places in Nebraska
National Register of Historic Places in Banner County, Nebraska